+Beryll is a luxury accessory company based in Los Angeles, California. They specialize in designer sunglasses and other lifestyle accessories such as clothes. It has a flagship store in Santa Monica, and is sold at approximately 500 other outlets.

Overview
+Beryll was founded in 2006 by Sigmar Berg in Los Angeles, California. Berg (born 1975), an Austrian-born painter, photographer,  and fashion designer, had moved to Los Angeles in 2006 with his family. Trained as an architect, he soon began designing accessories in his Santa Monica studio. He originally focused hand-made sunglasses for the brand, later expanding into jewelry, handbags, boots, belts, hats, scarves, leather vests, and other accessories.

Sigmar is "largely influenced by his European roots," and in particular the architecture style of Bauhaus. His products tend to be unisex, and also incorporate styles of Southern California. The brand uses a crew of "artisan workers" to craft its products.

The company has a flagship store in Santa Monica, California. Originally by-appointment only, it later opened to the general public. The brand is also sold at over 500 stores such as Henri Bendel, Maxfield, Barney's, and Fred Segal.

According to the brand, its products have been worn by celebrities like Angelina Jolie, Brad Pitt, David LaChapelle, Drew Barrymore, Lenny Kravitz, Katie Holmes, Kevin Dillon, Steven Tyler, Robert De Niro, Kim Basinger, Nicolas Cage and others. Kristin Cavallari wore the Beryll "Air" sunglasses on The Hills Season 6 Ep.1. Other sunglasses have been worn by Sarah Jessica Parker, Anna Pacquin, Sharon Stone, and Demi Moore.

References

External links

Beryll
Beryll
Beryll
Beryll
Beryll
Beryll
Beryll
Beryll